Brandon Barnes (born February 28, 1985) is a former American football offensive tackle. He was signed by the Baltimore Ravens as an undrafted free agent in 2008. He played college football at Grand Valley State.

Barnes was also a member of the Green Bay Blizzard and Indianapolis Colts.

External links
Green Bay Blizzard bio
Grand Valley State Lakers bio
Indianapolis Colts bio

1985 births
Living people
Players of American football from Detroit
American football offensive tackles
American football offensive guards
Grand Valley State Lakers football players
Baltimore Ravens players
Green Bay Blizzard players
Indianapolis Colts players
Milwaukee Iron players